Bravo My Life is a 2017 South Korean television series starring Do Ji-won, Park Sang-min, Yeon Jung-hoon, Jeong Yu-mi, Hyun Woo, and Kang Ji-sub. The series airs four consecutive episodes on Saturday on SBS TV from 8:55 p.m. to 11:15 p.m. (KST) starting from October 21, 2017.

Synopsis
The story is set in the world of television drama production, and revolves around three main characters: a haughty drama PD, an assistant director who's still waiting to catch her big break, and a frustrated actor who still hasn't debuted after seven years in the industry.

Cast

Main
 Jeong Yu-mi as Ha Do-na 
An assistant director who is passionate and enthusiastic about her work to the point of being nicknamed "Lunatic". She is still waiting for the day when she can become a full-fledged director.
 Hyun Woo as Kim Bum-woo
An actor who has been in the industry for seven years but has yet to catch his big break as his anxiety in front of cameras hinders his acting during the final cut. He has mostly been cast in nameless or bit-part roles and works several other part-time jobs on the side. He falls in love with Do-na after meeting her when she was assigned to help him overcome his anxiety.
 Kang Ji-sub as Seol Do-hyun
A famous actor whom Do-na was assigned to as a production assistant. He notices Do-na and develops feelings for her.
 Do Ji-won as Song Mi-ja/Rara
Young-woong's wife and a former actress. She now lives the high life as the wife of a chaebol but has been hiding a painful secret.
 Park Sang-min as Jung Young-woong
Chairman of Juvis (JU) Group and husband of Song Mi-ja
 Yeon Jung-hoon as Shin Dong-woo
A television director well known for being a workaholic. He only focuses on his work and does not believe in forming friendships, often being extremely curt with his staff.

Supporting

JU Group
 Park Seon-im as Jung Hye-mi
 Hyun Jyu-ni as Jung Sung-ah, daughter of Chairman Jung and Song Mi-ja who eschews her life as an heiress and would rather become a singer

JT Group
 Dokgo Young-jae as Kim Ho-tae
 Kim Hyeseon as Choi Min-kyung
 Kang Sung-min as Kim Joon-ho
 Jiyul as Kim Seo-hyun

People in SBC Drama company
 Shin Joo-ah as Kang Ha-young
 Jeon Se-hyun as Kang Ha-kyung
 Kim Joon-hyun as Yoo Gil-joon
 Kim Kiri as Chul-seon
 Joo Sung-hwan as Drama Department Head

People around Do-na
 Ban Hyo-jung as Park Sun-jin
 Ha Jae-sook as Lee Young-hee

People around Dong-woo
 Park Hyun-sook as Shin Hwa-im, a veteran actress and Dong-woo's paternal aunt

People around Do-hyun
 Kwon Oh-joong as Kim Oh-book
 Kim Noo-ri as Man-soo

Ratings 
 In this table,  represent the lowest ratings and  represent the highest ratings.
  denotes that the drama did not rank in the Top 20 daily rankings.
 N/A denotes that the rating is not known.

Awards and nominations

Notes

References

External links
  

Seoul Broadcasting System television dramas
2017 South Korean television series debuts
2018 South Korean television series endings
Korean-language television shows
South Korean melodrama television series
Television series by Studio Dragon
Television series by Hwa&Dam Pictures